Saint Pius X College is a Roman Catholic co-educational secondary school in Magherafelt, County Londonderry, Northern Ireland.

History
The building of the school commenced in 1962 and opened for three hundred pupils in September 1964. The official opening by Cardinal Conway took place in June 1965. Edward Quinn, supported by the vice principal, Sister Immaculata Quinn, assumed the role of the school's first principal.

Initially the pupils pursued courses leading to Junior Certificate examination level only. However, with the appointment of Mr J. Murphy, who succeeded Mr Quinn as principal in 1967, many new courses and programmes of study were soon on offer. Much success, academic and otherwise, was achieved under the very able leadership of Mr Murphy, who managed the significant growth of the school before taking early retirement in 1979. Sean O'Kane, who succeeded Murphy, was widely regarded as an innovative leader whose primary focus was the cultivation of a supportive culture which fostered the personal growth and enhanced the self-confidence of each member of the college community. At a time of immense educational and social change he actively engaged with a variety of initiatives and programmes culminating in the conferment of the Schools Curriculum Award in  1990. 

On 25 October 1989, the school celebrated its Silver Jubilee with a Mass of Thanksgiving in The Church of The Assumption. Dean McLarnon was the chief celebrant on this memorable occasion. He was assisted by a number of local and visiting clergy, including the present chairperson, Canon O'Byrne (PPVF) who has been closely associated with the college since its inception. Both Canon O'Byrne and Mr O'Kane worked tirelessly throughout the 1980s and 1990s to ensure that the school remained at the forefront of educational practice. The success enjoyed during this period is testimony to their efforts. Opportunities to ensure that the school's students left as rounded citizens were embraced within the wide-ranging sporting and cultural activities offered. Much success was experienced including capturing the Rannafast, Corn na nÓg, Brock and Dalton cups, while the 1990 camogie team won the Ulster Colleges C competition. 

The rapid growth in population in Mid-Ulster led to a huge increase in demand for places at the school and a 'mobile village' sprung up around the permanent buildings. It was not until May 1998, however, that approval was given for a major building and refurbishment programme at an initial costing of £12 million. With the eagerly awaited arrival of the major contractor, F B. McKee in March 2000, the project began. O'Kane retired in 1999, handing the leadership over to Mr F Devenny. He accepted the task of maintaining the college's high standards of achievement, while also attending to the day-to-day running of the college. He kept a watchful eye on the building programme, which ensured that the necessary development work to keep the school to the forefront of educational practice was effected. Principal Devenny secured the full co-operation of both teaching and construction staff throughout the building programme thus ensuring the smooth running of the scheme. 

During this period he steered the college to further success with the highest ever level of GCSE success being achieved in 2003. The college achieved Laureate Status in the Sharing Excellent Practice in ICT award, conferred in May 2003, and one of the teachers was awarded the BT Teaching Award for the Most Creative Use of ICT. The new building was completed in June 2003.

Principals

Enrollment
The school opened in September 1964 with 340 pupils. As of 2007 the school's enrollment was 970. This increase reflects the popularity and success of the school as well as the induction the sixth form within the college. Applications for places were oversubscribed each year for the previous fifteen years. Pupils, most of whom travel by bus, come from counties Londonderry, Tyrone and Antrim.

Building programme
St. Pius won a £26 million grant to refurbish the school, which was completed in 2003. The new school excellent ICT (Information and Communications Technology) resources, a Gaelic games pitch, an all-weather football pitch, basketball and tennis courts. There are 276 school-networked personal computers. This process was originally planned to cost £12 million but ended up costing £15 million. 85% of the school is new and the remaining percentage was renovated.

Sixth form
In 2004 the school's status changed to a college to accommodate for their provisions of the sixth form. The change of status also saw a name change to Saint Pius X College. The development of the sixth form allowed students to continue into years 13 and 14 (these year groups were previously not offered at the school). Previously, students looking to develop their educational careers had to move on to other schools in the area. A Levels in the college require blood, sweat and tears in order

External links
St Pius X College's official website

Educational institutions established in 1964
Catholic secondary schools in Northern Ireland
Secondary schools in County Londonderry
1964 establishments in Northern Ireland
Magherafelt